West View is an unincorporated community located within Ridgefield Park in Bergen County, New Jersey, United States. 
It was a stop on the West Shore Railroad.

References

Ridgefield Park, New Jersey
Unincorporated communities in Bergen County, New Jersey